Concordville is an unincorporated community in Concord Township, Delaware County, Pennsylvania, United States. It is located 20 miles west-southwest of Philadelphia, at the junction of U.S. Routes 1 and 322.  This intersection can be traced back to two of the earliest roads in Pennsylvania, Baltimore Pike which became U.S. 1, and Concord Pike, which connected Pennsylvania with Delaware.

The first European settlement in the area occurred about 1700, after Quakers bought land from William Penn.  Two Friends Meetinghouses (formerly Orthodox and Hicksite) are located in the village. The Orthodox meetinghouse was built in the first half of the nineteenth century, while the Hicksites retained the original meetinghouse (built 1728, reconstructed and expanded 1788). The two factions have since merged and now meet in the original meetinghouse. Part of the village was added to the National Register in 1973.

Glen Mills Schools, a juvenile residential facility, is near Concordville.

Notable people
Weldon Brinton Heyburn (Pennsylvania politician)
 Phil Margera
 Vincent Margera
 Sarah Stilwell Weber

See also

Concord Friends Meetinghouse
Concordville Historic District
Handwrought
High Hill Farm
Newlin Mill Complex
Nicholas Newlin House

External links

Concord Township Historical Commission, Concord Township website
Concordville Area Map, Local Concordville area street map

References

Houses on the National Register of Historic Places in Pennsylvania
Unincorporated communities in Delaware County, Pennsylvania
Unincorporated communities in Pennsylvania
Houses in Delaware County, Pennsylvania
Historic districts on the National Register of Historic Places in Pennsylvania
National Register of Historic Places in Delaware County, Pennsylvania